Simpsonaias ambigua, the salamander mussel or mudpuppy mussel, is a species of bivalve in the family Unionidae. It is unique among freshwater mussels in using mudpuppies as its glochidial host. It is the only freshwater mussel known to have a non-fish host.

Distribution and conservation status 
The mussel is native to the United States and Ontario, Canada. The Canadian Species at Risk Act listed the Salamander mussel in the List of Wildlife Species at Risk as being endangered in Canada.

References

Simpsonaias
Molluscs of the United States
Molluscs of Canada
Bivalves described in 1825
Taxonomy articles created by Polbot